Zaphnath-Paaneah is the name  given by Pharaoh to Joseph in the Genesis narrative.

The name may be of Egyptian origins, but there is no straightforward etymology; some Egyptologists accept that the second element of the name may contain the word  "life".

Interpretations 

 

Targum Onkelos (1st century CE) gives the meaning of the name as "the man to whom hidden things are revealed"; Targum Pseudo-Jonathan, "the man who revealeth mysteries"; Josephus (c. CE 94), "a finder of mysteries". Rashi (11th-12th century CE) in his commentary on the Torah gives the meaning "explainer of hidden things". Nachmanides (13th century) gives “explainer of secrets”, while Bahya ben Asher (13th-14th century) gives "the one who reveals secrets". This would give us the literal translation of צָפְנַת פַּעְנֵחַ (Ṣāp̄naṯ Paʿnēaḥ) from Hebrew as "He [who] deciphered the Hidden".

The Jewish interpretation is received in early Protestant translations: the Geneva Bible (1599) glosses "The expounder of secrets", while the Authorised Version of 1611 has in the margin: "Which in the Coptic signifies, 'A revealer of secrets', or 'The man to whom secrets are revealed.'"

In his work on Genesis, and in the Vulgate, Jerome gives as the Latin translation  "saviour of the world". This, at least, is the suggestion made by Wilhelm Gesenius in his Hebrew-Chaldee Lexicon. Early Egyptologists have interpreted the name as equivalent to Coptic   or   meaning "the salvation of the age".

After the decipherment of hieroglyphics, Egyptologists have interpreted the final element of the name as containing the  Egyptian word  "life"; notably, Georg Steindorff in 1889 offered a full reconstruction of ḏd pꜣ nṯr iw.f ꜥnḫ "the god speaks [and] he lives". Egyptologist Patrick Clarke, however, has pointed out this interpretation's shortcomings; namely, this name-type is unattested prior to the 11th century BCE while Joseph lived much earlier, and this name type "always mentioned a specific deity, never ‘the god’". 
 

Clarke's objections were already raised in 1929 by Abraham Yahuda, who also pointed out that this type of name makes sense only when it is given to a newborn, placing the baby under the god's protection; he suggested instead ḏfꜣ n tꜣ pꜣ ꜥnḫ "the living one is the sustenance of (the) land" or ḏfꜣ n tꜣ pw ꜥnḫ "the sustenance of the land is he, the living one." 
 

Jozef Vergote agreed with Yahuda's criticism of Steindorff's hypothesis but in turn considered the expression "living one" in Yahuda's suggestion to be "." Instead, Vergote returns to the Septuagint version, explaining  as pꜣ s nty ꜥm=f nꜣ iḫ.t, "the man who knows the things," consistent with the traditional Jewish interpretation.

References

Bibliography 
Marquardt, Philologus, vii. 676; 
Cheyne and Black, Encyc. Bibl. col. 5379 (where a disfigured Hebrew original is suspected); 
Steindorff, G.,  41, 45. ZÄS 27, 1889, 41–42. 
Proc. Soc. Bibl. Arch. xx. 208 (where the other theories have been collected). E. G.

Notes 

Joseph (Genesis)
Egypt in the Hebrew Bible